The Stourport High School & VIth Form Centre, formerly known as the Stourport High School and Language College, opened to students in 1956 as an 11-18 school. The starting age was increased to 13 during the 1970s, but reverted to 11 in 2007 as part of the Wyre Forest Review. The school is located in the town of Stourport-on-Severn in Worcestershire, England. It was built to replace the Stourport Secondary Modern School, which was formerly Lickhill Middle.

Present Day
In October 2018, Ofsted judged the school as 'Requires Improvement' in all areas on their 4-point scale, after inspectors found standards had 'declined considerably' since the school was rated outstanding in 2012.

The school became an Academy in 2012.

References

Academies in Worcestershire
Secondary schools in Worcestershire
Stourport-on-Severn